Segurista (International title: Dead Sure) is a 1996 Philippine drama film co-written and directed by Tikoy Aguiluz. The film stars Michelle Aldana as the title role.

Plot
By day, Karen Fernandez (Michelle Aldana) is a sales agent for an insurance company. She constantly meets sales targets set by her company and is considered as their top agent.  By night, she covertly works as a guest relations officer (GRO), which she uses to draw her daytime clients to buy into her insurance product.  All of her activities day and night are for one reason: securing the future of her family.  Amidst the temptation of falling in love with her clients, Karen is focused on working hard for the money.

A tragedy occurs when a night of having fun went wrong.  Resisting the advances of her friend's lover, she flees by riding a taxi.  But the taxi driver himself had other plans as he decides to bring Karen to a lahar-infested area and satisfy his lust on her before killing her off.  Her death served as a catalyst for change as her beneficiaries finally receive the fruits of her labor.

Cast
 Michelle Aldana as Karen Fernandez
 Gary Estrada as Sonny Reyes
 Ruby Moreno as Ruby Dimagiba
 Albert Martinez as Jake
 Julio Diaz as Eddie
 Pen Medina as Pepe Moreno
 Eddie Rodriguez as Lawyer
 Liza Lorena as Mrs. Librada
 Suzette Ranillo as Brian
 Teresa Loyzaga as Grace
 Anthony Castelo as Technocrat
 Roy de Guzman as Male Customer
 Manjo del Mundo as Caloy
 Celsar Bendigo as Joemar
 Evelyn Vargas as Candy
 Melisse Santiago as Winnie
 Vangie Labalan as Aling Choleng
 Pocholo Montes as Club Manager

Awards
The film won seven awards in the 21st Gawad Urian Awards, including Best Picture, Best Director and Best Supporting Actor.

The film was selected as the Philippines entry for the Best Foreign Language Film at the 69th Academy Awards, but was not accepted as a nominee.

References

External links
 

1996 films
1996 drama films
Philippine drama films
Tagalog-language films
Neo Films films